Masu'ot Yitzhak (lit. Yitzhak's Beacons) is a moshav shitufi in southern Israel. Located near Ashkelon, it falls under the jurisdiction of Shafir Regional Council. The original kibbutz in Gush Etzion was destroyed and depopulated in the 1948 Arab–Israeli War, and a new settlement was established in 1949 in a different location.

History

Kibbutz Masu'ot Yitzhak was founded in 1945 in Gush Etzion, midway between Jerusalem and Hebron. The settlers were young pioneers from Hungary, Czechoslovakia, and Germany who arrived before World War II. The kibbutz was named for the chief rabbi of Mandatory Palestine, Yitzhak HaLevi Herzog. 

The settlers of Masu'ot Yitzhak rose to the challenge of living in the Judean Mountains, building homes and planting orchards. In 1948, Gush Etzion was captured by the Arab Legion. The residents of Kfar Etzion were massacred, and all other inhabitants of Gush Etzion, including the residents of Masu'ot Yitzhak, were captured and imprisoned in Jordan.

After their return from captivity in 1949, the Masu'ot Yitzhak pioneers established a new moshav of the same name near Shafir, a region inhabited by the Philistines in biblical times. Shafir had served as a base for the southern front of the Israeli army during the 1948 war, and the land on which the new Masu'ot Yitzhak was founded had until shortly beforehand belonged to the depopulated Palestinian village of al-Sawafir al-Gharbiyya.

Tzahali, a military preparatory program for religious girls, is based in Masu'ot Yitzhak.

Economy
The moshav economy is based on agriculture and industry. A reservoir was built 40 years ago to harness the winter flood waters of Nahal Lachish for farming. The water is used to irrigate  of avocado trees.

References

Further reading
Yossi Katz, Between Jerusalem and Hebron: Jewish Settlement in the Pre-State Period

External links
Village website 
Memorial for Masu'ot Yitzhak in Gush Etzion Etzion Bloc 
Orit Segal (2006): Massu’ot Yizhaq Final Report, Hadashot Arkheologiyot – Excavations and Surveys in Israel, No. 118.

Moshavim
Populated places established in 1945
Populated places established in 1949
Former kibbutzim
Jewish villages depopulated during the 1948 Arab–Israeli War
Populated places in Southern District (Israel)
1945 establishments in Mandatory Palestine
1948 disestablishments in Mandatory Palestine
1949 establishments in Israel
Czech-Jewish culture in Israel
German-Jewish culture in Israel
Hungarian-Jewish culture in Israel
Slovak-Jewish culture in Israel